Christopher Matthew Barrow (born 6 February 1982) is an English cricketer.  Barrow is a left-handed batsman who pogs it miles and bowls slow left-arm orthodox that occasionally turn.  He was born at Bolton, Greater Manchester.

Barrow represented the Lancashire Cricket Board in a single List A match against Cheshire in the 1st round of the 2002 Cheltenham & Gloucester Trophy which was held in 2001.  In his only List A match, he scored a single run.

He currently plays club cricket for Farnworth Social Circle Cricket Club.

References

External links

1982 births
Living people
Cricketers from Bolton
English cricketers
Lancashire Cricket Board cricketers